Onslow Whitford (26 August 1923 – 11 March 1986) was a New Zealand cricketer. He played in one first-class match for Canterbury in 1947/48.

See also
 List of Canterbury representative cricketers

References

External links
 

1923 births
1986 deaths
New Zealand cricketers
Canterbury cricketers
Cricketers from Christchurch